This article refers to sports broadcasting contracts in Bulgaria. For a list of rights in other countries, see Sports television broadcast contracts.

Multi-discipline events 
 Summer Olympics: BNT
 Winter Olympics: BNT

Basketball 
 National Basketball Association: Diema Sport
 Liga ACB: Nova Sport
 FIBA EuroBasket: BNT
 FIBA Basketball World Cup: BNT

Football 
 FIFA World Cup: BNT
 FIFA Club World Cup: BNT
 UEFA Champions League: BTV Media Group (BTV Action, RING, Voyo)
 UEFA Europa League: BNT, BTV Media Group (BTV Action, RING, Voyo)
 UEFA Super Cup: BTV Media Group (BTV Action)
 UEFA European Championship: BNT, Nova television (including Diema and Diema Sport)
 First Professional Football League: Diema Sport
 Second Professional Football League: Diema Sport
 Premier League: Diema Sport
 EFL Championship: Diema Sport
 FA Cup: Diema Sport
 Football League Cup: Diema Sport
 La Liga: TV+
 Copa del Rey: BTV Media Group (BTV Action, RING, Voyo)
 Primeira Liga: Mtel Sport
 Eredivisie: Mtel Sport
 Russian Premier League: Mtel Sport
 Ligue 1: Diema Sport
 Serie A: RING
 Coppa Italia: RING
A-League: YouTube
W-League: YouTube
 Chinese Super League: Mtel Sport
 Indian Super League: Mtel Sport
K League 1: YouTube

Fight Sports
Dream Boxing: DAZN: October 2022 to October 2025, all fights
Bushido MMA: DAZN: October 2022 to October 2025, all fights
Glory: Arena Sport
King of Kings: DAZN: October 2022 to October 2025, all fights

Ice Hockey 
 National Hockey League: Mtel Sport

Motor racing 
 Formula One: Diema Sport
 MotoGP: Mtel Sport
 NASCAR: Mtel Sport
 World Rally Championship: BNT HD
 Formula E: Eurosport
 European Rally Championship: Eurosport
 MXGP: Eurosport
 Wtcc: Eurosport

Volleyball 
FIVB: BNT

Tennis 
 ATP World Tour: Mtel Sport
 WTA - TV+, Sport+
 Australian Open: Eurosport
 French Open: Eurosport
 US open: Eurosport
 The Championship Wimbledon: Eurosport

Wintersports 
 Biathlon World Cup: BNT
 FIS Alpine Ski World Cup: BNT

Cycling 
 Tour de france: Eurosport
 Giro d italia: Eurosport
 Vuelta de espana: Eurosport

Bulgaria